The Pustinja Monastery is a Serbian Orthodox monastery in village Poćuta near Valjevo in Central Serbia.

According to local legends this monastery was built in the 13th century by king Dragutin. Scientific researches found that the monastery was actually built in 1622 on the remnants of the older monastery which was built in the 11th century. The construction of the monastery has been completed on 25 June 1622.

Architecture
The monastery was built in the Raška architectural school.  In terms of architectural and spatial traits, there is resemblance between the Uvac Monastery, Church of the Annunciation Monastery in Ovčar Banja, Pustinja Monastery, Dobrilovina Monastery, Majstorovina Monastery, Tronoša Monastery and others.

See also 
List of Serb Orthodox monasteries

References

External links

Serbian Orthodox monasteries in Serbia
Architecture in Serbia
Cultural Monuments of Great Importance (Serbia)
1625 establishments in the Ottoman Empire
17th-century Serbian Orthodox church buildings
Nemanjić dynasty endowments